Verdesse is a white French wine grape variety grown primarily in the Bugey AOC of eastern France (though it is not currently permitted in the AOC wine). It is also permitted under the Vin de Savoie AOC for wines produced in the Isère department up to a maximum allowance of 10%.<ref>Vino Files Jura and Savoie, Accessed: July 4th, 2012</ref> Ampelographers believe that the variety is likely very old and originated along the Drac and Grésivaudan valleys in Isère.

Viticulture

Verdesse tends to thrive in clay and limestone slopes. It has a high tolerance to botrytis but can be very susceptible to powdery and downy mildew. The grape tends to form small to medium, compact clusters that take on a conical shape with often a side-wing cluster. The berries tend to vary from greenish white to a golden yellow after veraison'' and may even take on an amber shade when fully ripe and sun burnt. The skin of the small to medium size, ellipsoid berries are usually very thick.

In the 20th century, ampelographers Louis Levadoux and (decades later) Linda Bisson categorized Verdesse as a member of the Pelorsien eco-geogroup along with Bia blanc, Béclan, Dureza, Exbrayat, Durif, Jacquère, Mondeuse blanche, Peloursin, Servanin and Joubertin.

Wines
 
The grape has the potential of producing full bodied, highly alcoholic wine with pronounce aromatics. Despite the inference of several of its synonyms, the aromas of wines made from Verdesse are usually not "musky".

Synonyms
Over the years Verdesse has been known under a variety of synonyms including: Bian ver, Bian vert, Blanchette, Clairette de Chindrieux, Clairette précoce, Dongine, Etraire Blanche, Verdasse, Verdea, Verdêche, Verdesse Muscade, Verdeze musqué and Verdeze musquée. Vitis International Variety Catalogue (VIVC) Verdesse Accessed: July 4th, 2012

References

White wine grape varieties